Tashkurgan is a town in the far northwest of China, close to the country's border with Tajikistan, Afghanistan, and Pakistan. It is the principal town and seat of Tashkurgan Tajik Autonomous County, in the autonomous region of Xinjiang. Tashkurgan is home to many Mountain Tajiks, ethnic Pamiris who live in China.

Name
Tashkurgan means "stone fortress" or "stone tower" in the Turkic languages. The historical Chinese name for the town was a literal translation, Shitoucheng. The official spelling (per the Chinese government) is Taxkorgan, while Tashkorgan and Tashkurghan appear occasionally in literature. Historically, the town was also called Sarikol, also spelled Sariqol or traditionally Sariq Qol.

History

Pre-1900s 

Tashkurgan has a long history as a stop on the Silk Road. Major caravan routes converged here leading to Kashgar in the north, Yecheng to the east, Badakhshan and Wakhan to the west, and Chitral and Hunza to the southwest (modern Khyber Pakhtunkhwa and Gilgit-Baltistan, Pakistan).

About 2000 years ago, during the Han dynasty, Tashkurgan was the main centre of the Kingdom of Puli mentioned in the Book of Han and the Book of the Later Han. Later it became known as Varshadeh. Mentions in the Weilüe of the Kingdom of Manli probably also refer to Tashkurgan.

Some scholars believe that Tashkurgan is the "Stone Tower" mentioned by Ptolemy in his famous treatise Geography, which is said to have marked the midway point between Europe and China on the old Silk Road. Other scholars, however, disagree with this identification, though it remains one of the four most probable sites for the Stone Tower.

Centuries later Tashkurgan became the capital of the Sarikol Kingdom located in the Pamir Mountains, and later of Qiepantuo under the Persian Empire. At the northeast corner of the town is a huge fortress known as the Tashkurgan Fort (Stone Fort; Stone Tower) dating from the Yuan dynasty (1279–1368 CE) and the subject of many colourful local legends. A ruined fire temple is near the fortress.

The Buddhist monk Xuanzang passed through Tashkurgan around 649 CE, on his way to Khotan from Badakhshan, as did Song Yun around 500 CE. When Aurel Stein passed through the town in the early twentieth century he was pleased to find that Tashkurgan matched the descriptions left by those travellers: discussing Qiepantuo, Xuanzang recorded (in Samuel Beal's translation), "This country is about 200 li in circuit; the capital rests on a great rocky crag of the mountain, and is backed by the river Śitâ. It is about 20 li in circuit." Xuanzang's discussion of Qiepantuo in book twelve of Great Tang Records on the Western Regions recounts a tale which might explain the name of Princess Castle, a tourist attraction near Tashkurgan: A Han Chinese princess on her way to marry a Persian king is placed on a high rock for safety during local unrest. She becomes pregnant from a mysterious stranger, ultimately giving birth to a powerful king and founding the royal line ruling at the time of Xuanzang's visit. Stein records a version of this, current at the time of his visit, in which the princess is the daughter of the Persian king Naushīrvān.

Aurel Stein argued that, judging from the topography and remains found around Tashkurgan, the fort and associated settlements had clearly been central to the broader Sarikol area, controlling routes from the Oxus to the oases of southern Turkestan.

Xuanzang describes a substantial Buddhist site with tall towers, leading Stein to speculate as to whether the pilgrimage site dedicated to Shāh Auliya, several hundred yards to the northeast of the town site, and in use at the time of his visit, might have seen continuous but changing local use as a holy site down the centuries.

The region became under Qing dynasty rule when Chinese claimed suzerainty over the region.

Post-1900s 

During the Ili Rebellion from 1944 to 1949, Uyghur forces slaughtered the livestock of the Tajiks as they advanced south.

In 1959, Tashkurgan Commune was established.

In 1984, Tashkurgan Commune became Tashkurgan Town.

A number of residential communities have been added to and removed from Tashkurgan for census purposes. In 2010-11, the residential communities of Bulakegale and Xudong were added to the town and Kuonabazha and Yingshahai'er were removed. In 2016-7, the residential community Xingfu was added to the town. In 2017-8, the residential community Hongqi was added to the town. In 2018-9, the residential community Shajilin was added to the town.

Museum

In Tashkurgan there is a museum that houses a few local artifacts, a photographic display and, in the basement, two mummies – one of a young woman about 18 and another of a baby about three months old who was not hers. They are labelled as dating from the Bronze Age to the Warring States period (475−221 BCE). The mummies were discovered in the nearby Xiabandi Valley on the old caravan route to Yarkand. The valley has now been flooded for a hydro-electric project.

Geography

Tashkurgan is the seat of Tashkurgan Tajik Autonomous County. Tashkurgan is a market town for sheep, wool and woollen goods, particularly carpets, and is surrounded by orchards. The majority population in the town are ethnic Mountain Tajiks. The majority of people in the region speak Sarikoli. There is also a village of Wakhi speakers. Mandarin Chinese and Uyghur are also spoken.

The Tashkurgan River begins just north of the Khunjerab Pass and flows north along the Karakoram Highway to Tashkurgan.  Just north of Tashkurgan it turns east and flows through a gorge to the Tarim Basin where it joins the Yarkand River.

Climate
Tashkurgan has a cold desert climate (Köppen BWk), influenced by the high elevation, with long, very cold winters, and warm summers. An average of only  of precipitation falls per year.

Administrative divisions
, the town included six residential communities (Mandarin Chinese pinyin-derived names):
 Kashigale, Bulakegale, Xudong, Xingfu, Hongqi, Shajilin

As of 2009, there were three residential communities:
 Kashigale, Kuonabazha, Yingshahai'er

Transportation 
As the area is remote from populated regions, it is served by Tashkurgan Khunjerab Airport, which opened on 23 December 2022, with 3800 meter runway.  It will be China's closest airport to Pakistan, Tajikistan, and Afghanistan.

Karakoram Highway

Today Tashkurgan is on the Karakoram Highway which follows the old Silk Road route from China to Pakistan. Accommodation is available and it is a recommended overnight stop for road travellers from China to Pakistan, in order to have the best chance of crossing the snow-prone Khunjerab Pass in daylight.  Special registration with the police must be made before entering Tashkurgan, and Chinese citizens must receive written permission from their local police department before entering the region.

Passenger road service between Tashkurgan and the Pakistani towns of Sust and Gilgit has existed for many years, and road service between Kashgar and Gilgit (via Tashkurgan and Sust) started in summer 2006. However, the border crossing between China and Pakistan at Khunjerab Pass (the highest border of the world) is open only between 1 May and 15 October. During winter, the roads are blocked by snow.

See also
 Belt and Road Initiative
 Silk Road transmission of Buddhism
 Taghdumbash Pamir
 Taxkorgan Nature Reserve

Footnotes

References
 Curzon, George Nathaniel. 1896. The Pamirs and the Source of the Oxus. Royal Geographical Society, London. Reprint: Elibron Classics Series, Adamant Media Corporation. 2005.  (pbk);  (hbk).
 Hill, John E. (2009). Through the Jade Gate to Rome: A Study of the Silk Routes during the Later Han Dynasty, First to Second Centuries CE. John E. Hill. BookSurge. .
 库尔班, 西仁, 马达 力包仑, and 米尔扎 杜斯买买提. 中国塔吉克史料汇编. Ürümqi: 新疆大学出版社, 2003. .

External links

 Check out note 20.2. to the translation of the Hou Hanshu by John Hill. http://depts.washington.edu/silkroad/texts/hhshu/hou_han_shu.html
 For a brief description and some photos.

Populated places in Xinjiang
Populated places along the Silk Road
Central Asian Buddhist kingdoms
Central Asian Buddhist sites
Former countries in Chinese history
Iranian languages regions
Tashkurgan Tajik Autonomous County
Township-level divisions of Xinjiang
County seats in Xinjiang